Bart Max Geert Smals (born 5 April 1970) is a Dutch politician serving as a member of the House of Representatives since 2019. A member of the People's Party for Freedom and Democracy (VVD), he previously chaired the party group in the municipal council of Delft from 2014 to 2019.

A pharmacist by trade, he grew up in Apeldoorn. He studied at Utrecht University before moving to Maarssenbroek.

References 

Living people
1970 births
People from Breda
People from Apeldoorn
People from Delft
Utrecht University alumni
21st-century Dutch politicians
Members of the House of Representatives (Netherlands)
People's Party for Freedom and Democracy politicians
20th-century Dutch people